XHCMM-FM is a radio station on 95.5 FM in Coalcomán, Michoacán, Mexico, broadcasting from atop Cerro El Mono. It serves as a rimshot into the Colima City, Colima, radio market. It is owned by Homero Bautista Duarte and is known as Adictiva Radio.

History
XECMM-AM received its concession on February 11, 1994. It was owned by Francisco Bautista Valencia until 2001. Until taking on the Ke Buena format in 2017, XHCMM was known as Stereo Mass. The station shed the franchised format in August 2018.

References

Radio stations in Michoacán